Raguzino is a rural locality (a village) in Muromtsevskoye Rural Settlement, Sudogodsky District, Vladimir Oblast, Russia. The population was 13 as of 2010.

Geography 
Raguzino is located on the Voyninga River, 5 km southwest of Sudogda (the district's administrative centre) by road. Afonino is the nearest rural locality.

References 

Rural localities in Sudogodsky District